"Sea Slumber Song" is a 19th-century poem by Roden Noel set to music by Sir Edward Elgar as the first song in his song-cycle Sea Pictures (1899).

Lyrics

The poem here is as sung in Sea Pictures.

Italicised text indicates lines repeated in the song but not in the original poem.

Elgar's setting 
The sea's lullaby ("I, the Mother mild") is evoked by bass drum and tam-tam and strings repeating a phrase that reappears later in the song cycle. At "Isles in elfin light" the music changes key to C major before returning to the oceanic theme.

References

Further reading 
  — Del Mar's notes on how to conduct the Sea Slumber Song

Songs about oceans and seas
English poems
1899 songs
Songs by Edward Elgar